Colón Department is a  department of Córdoba Province in Argentina.

Settlements
Agua de Oro
Ascochinga
Colonia Caroya
Colonia Tirolesa
Colonia Vicente Agüero
Dumesnil
El Manzano
Estación General Paz
Estación Juárez Celman
Jesús María
La Calera
La Granja
Malvinas Argentinas
Mendiolaza
Mi Granja
Río Ceballos
Saldán
Salsipuedes
Tinoco
Unquillo
Villa Allende
Villa Cerro Azul

External links

Departments of Córdoba Province, Argentina